Maria Teresa Ruiz (born June 28, 1974) is an American Democratic Party politician, who has represented the 29th Legislative District in the New Jersey State Senate since taking office on January 8, 2008. She has served as the Senate Majority Leader since 2022, becoming the first Latina to lead either the Assembly or Senate, after succeeding Loretta Weinberg upon her retirement from the Senate.

Education
Born and raised in Newark, New Jersey, Ruiz graduated from Our Lady of Good Counsel High School.

In 1998, Ruiz received a B.A. from Drew University in English.

New Jersey Senate
With Sharpe James not running for re-election to the Senate seat in the 29th District, Ruiz won the support of Cory Booker and James' son. Ruiz won the June 2007 Democratic primary, running unopposed. In the November 2007 general election, Ruiz and her Assembly running mates Alberto Coutinho and L. Grace Spencer won the three seats from the district. Ruiz won with 57.8% of the vote, defeating five other candidates, including Democrats-running-as independents Luis Quintana (with 15.9%) in second place and William D. Payne (with 15.7%) who came in third.

Ruiz took office in the Senate in January 2008.

Committees 
Committee assignments for the current session are:
Legislative Oversight, Vice-Chair
Joint Budget Oversight
Joint Committee on Economic Justice and Equal Employment Opportunity
Budget and Appropriations

District 29 
Each of the 40 districts in the New Jersey Legislature has one representative in the New Jersey Senate and two members in the New Jersey General Assembly. The representatives from the 29th District for the 2022—23 Legislative Session are:
 Senator Teresa Ruiz  (D)
 Assemblywoman Eliana Pintor Marin  (D)
 Assemblywoman Shanique Speight  (D)

Election history

References

External links
Senator Ruiz's Legislative Website, New Jersey Legislature
New Jersey Legislature financial disclosure forms
2012 2011 2010 2009 2008 2007

|-

|-

1974 births
21st-century American politicians
21st-century American women politicians
American politicians of Puerto Rican descent
Drew University alumni
Hispanic and Latino American state legislators in New Jersey
Hispanic and Latino American women in politics
Living people
Democratic Party New Jersey state senators
Politicians from Newark, New Jersey
Puerto Rican people in New Jersey politics
Women state legislators in New Jersey